Edward James Milner Jr. (May 21, 1955 – November 2, 2015) was an American professional baseball player. He played all or parts of nine seasons in Major League Baseball for the Cincinnati Reds (1980–86, 1988) and San Francisco Giants (1987), primarily as a center fielder. Milner batted and threw left-handed.

Baseball career
Milner was drafted out of Central State University in Wilberforce, Ohio by the Reds in 1976. He was a part of the disappointing transition of the championship Cincinnati Reds teams of the 1970s. The Reds transitioned from players including Ken Griffey Sr., George Foster, and Ray Knight, taking their chances with players including Milner, Gary Redus, and Clint Hurdle. A highlight of Milner's career was a 20-game hitting streak 1986 in which he belted 15 home runs.

Milner suffered from cocaine addiction during his baseball career. Commissioner Peter Ueberroth suspended him for the entire 1988 season after he relapsed, but he was reinstated before the All-Star break after completing a drug rehabilitation program. The Reds released him on July 31, ending his major league career.

Career statistics
In a nine-year major league career, Milner played in 804 games, accumulating 607 hits in 2,395 at bats for a .253 career batting average along with 42 home runs, 195 runs batted in and an on-base percentage of .333. Defensively, he finished his career with a .987 fielding percentage playing at all three outfield positions. Along with César Tovar, Milner is regarded as the all-time major league leader in breaking up no-hit attempts with five. On August 2, 1986, Milner collected his team's only hit in a game for fifth time, tying Tovar's major league record (1975).

Personal life

Milner's cousin, John Milner, was also a major league player.

Milner died on November 2, 2015, in Cincinnati. The cause of death was not revealed.

References

External links
, or SABR Biography Project, or Retrosheet, or Pura Pelota (Venezuelan Winter League)

1955 births
2015 deaths
African-American baseball players
Baseball players from Columbus, Ohio
Billings Mustangs players
Central State Marauders baseball players
Chattanooga Lookouts players
Cincinnati Reds players
Fort Myers Sun Sox players
Indianapolis Indians players
Leones del Caracas players
American expatriate baseball players in Venezuela
Major League Baseball center fielders
Major League Baseball players suspended for drug offenses
Nashville Sounds players
Phoenix Firebirds players
San Francisco Giants players
Shelby Reds players
Tampa Tarpons (1957–1987) players
Tigres de Aragua players
20th-century African-American sportspeople
21st-century African-American people